The 2019 Kowloon City District Council election was held on 24 November 2019 to elect all 25 members of the Kowloon City District Council. It was part of the 2019 Hong Kong local elections.

The pro-democrats scored a historic landslide victory in the election amid the massive pro-democracy protests, taking control of the council by securing 15 of the 25 seats. The Democratic Party emerged as the largest party, overtaking DAB with 10 seats.

Overall election results
Before election:

Change in composition:

References

External links
 Election Results - Overall Results

2019 Hong Kong local elections